Argentina v England may refer to:
 Argentina v England (1986 FIFA World Cup)
 Argentina–England football rivalry